Theuma is a genus of African long-spinneret ground spiders that was first described by Eugène Louis Simon in 1893.It was transferred to the ground spiders in 2018, then returned in 2022.

Species
 it contains twenty-five species, found only in Botswana, Namibia, and South Africa:
Theuma ababensis Tucker, 1923 – South Africa
Theuma andonea Lawrence, 1927 – Namibia
Theuma aprica Simon, 1893 – South Africa
Theuma capensis Purcell, 1907 – Botswana, South Africa
Theuma cedri Purcell, 1907 – South Africa
Theuma elucubata Tucker, 1923 – South Africa
Theuma foveolata Tucker, 1923 – South Africa
Theuma funerea Lawrence, 1928 – Namibia
Theuma fusca Purcell, 1907 – Namibia, South Africa
Theuma longipes Lawrence, 1927 – Namibia
Theuma maculata Purcell, 1907 – South Africa
Theuma microphthalma Lawrence, 1928 – Namibia
Theuma mutica Purcell, 1907 – South Africa
Theuma ovambica Lawrence, 1927 – Namibia
Theuma parva Purcell, 1907 – South Africa
Theuma purcelli Tucker, 1923 – South Africa
Theuma pusilla Purcell, 1908 – Namibia, South Africa
Theuma recta Lawrence, 1927 – Namibia
Theuma schreineri Purcell, 1907 – South Africa
Theuma schultzei Purcell, 1908 – Namibia, South Africa
Theuma tragardhi Lawrence, 1947 – South Africa
Theuma velox Purcell, 1908 – Namibia
Theuma walteri (Simon, 1889) (type) – Turkmenistan?
Theuma xylina Simon, 1893 – South Africa
Theuma zuluensis Lawrence, 1947 – South Africa

See also
 List of Prodidominae species

References

Araneomorphae genera
Prodidominae
Spiders of Africa
Spiders of Asia